Bill Burns may refer to:
 Bill Burns (anchor) (1913–1997), American news anchor
 Bill Burns (artist) (born 1957), Canadian artist
 Bill Burns (Australian politician) (1933–2009), member of the Australian House of Representatives
 Bill Burns (baseball) (1880–1953), American baseball pitcher involved in the Black Sox scandal
 Bill Burns (footballer) (1884–1955), Richmond and East Fremantle player
 Bill Burns, the first known person in the UK convicted for animal cruelty under the Cruel Treatment of Cattle Act

See also
Billy Burns (disambiguation)
William Burns (disambiguation)
Bill Byrne (athletic director), American athletic director